, commonly known as  or  in Brazil, is the title of the Portuguese version of the popular English language song, Happy Birthday to you. It is traditionally sung to celebrate a person's birthday in countries where Portuguese is an official language. The lyrics were written by Berta Celeste, a Brazilian poet, in 1942.

History 
The traditional English language song, Happy Birthday to you, arrived in Brazil in the 1930s, where it would be sung, in English, at birthday parties. In 1942 the singer Almirante (Henrique Foréis Domingues), a Rádio Tupi presenter in Rio de Janeiro, launched a competition to select Portuguese lyrics to the melody of Happy Birthday to you. The winning entry took five minutes to write, and was written by Berta Celeste from Pindamonhangaba, São Paulo.

Lyrics 
Until her death in 1999, Berta Celeste insisted that the lyrics be sung as she wrote them. However the lyrics that are most commonly sung in Brazil are slightly different from the original, and it is also customary to add a second, unofficial verse.

Copyright 
While the English language version of the song is in the public domain, the Escritório Central de Arrecadação e Distribuição still collects royalties for the Portuguese song on behalf of the descendents of Berta Celeste.

See also
 List of birthday songs

References

1942 songs
Songs about birthdays
Songs about birthday parties
Copyright infringement
Public domain music
Songs involved in royalties controversies
Quotations from music